District 11 of the Oregon State Senate comprises parts of Marion County, including Woodburn and much of Salem. It is currently represented by Democrat Peter Courtney of Salem.

Election results
District boundaries have changed over time, therefore, senators before 2013 may not represent the same constituency as today. From 1993 until 2003, the district covered parts of Multnomah County, and from 2003 until 2013 it covered a slightly different area in the Salem metropolitan area.

References

11
Marion County, Oregon